Everyday Exotic is a Canadian instructional cooking series starring Roger Mooking.  It was produced by Magee TV in association with Food Network Canada.

Overview
Mooking, a third generation restaurateur, takes ingredients that are used in everyday cooking and shows how you can use their flavors and/or texture in the dishes he prepares.  Ingredients such as papaya, salt cod, duck, nori, and others are featured as the star ingredients. The purpose of the show is to focus on one "obedient ingredient" each episode and to show people how to shop for it, store it and then cook with it in various ways.  The series is telecast on many channels including: The Food Network channel in Canada, Cooking channel in USA and Caribbean, Food TV on Channel 9 Sky Digital, Kuchnia TV in Poland and in the Middle East.

Everyday Exotic premiered on May 31, 2008 and replaced the show Fine Living Network.

Episode guide
Season 1
Papaya
Lychee
Nori
Sichuan peppercorn
Thai basil
Coriander/Cilantro
Miso
Lemongrass
Star anise
Curry
Panko
Saffron
Okra
Plantain
Coconut
Water chestnuts
Tamarind
King oyster mushrooms
Maple syrup
Oyster sauce
Paprika
Mango
Celeriac
Cardamom

Season 2
Camembert
Prosciutto
Duck
Pine nuts
Edamame
Cajun spice
Rapini
Wonton
Pork belly
Buffalo mozzarella
Avocado
Peanuts
Catfish
Chipotle
Daikon
Caraway
Nappa cabbage
Lime leaf
Fermented black beans
Blood orange
Persimmon
Jerusalem artichoke
Tahini
Pistachio
Salt cod
Passion fruit

Broadcasters
Original
Food Network Canada

Syndicate
Cooking Channel

References

External links
Everyday Exotic on FoodNetwork.ca
Everyday Exotic on CookingChannelTV.com

Food Network (Canadian TV channel) original programming
2009 Canadian television series endings
2008 Canadian television series debuts
2000s Canadian cooking television series